A sail switch, vane switch or flow switch is a mechanical switch that is actuated on or off in response to the flow or non-flow of a fluid such as air or water. A sail switch typically operates through the use of a paddle or a diaphragm which gets displaced due to the force of fluid or air moving past it. Sail switches find application in the detection of fluid flow and measurement of fan speeds. A sail switch might be used to protect a fan forced pellet stove, central heating system, electric heating element from being energized before the air flow from the blower is established. Sail switches might also be used to alarm if a ventilation fan in a hazardous location fails and air flow has stopped.   For some HVAC systems, a sail switch can activate an electronic air cleaner, a humidifier, or other equipment in response to airflow from the system fan.

References

External links
 Vane Style Flow Switches

Switches